Kevin Nancekivell (born 22 October 1971) is a former semi-professional footballer who is currently a first team coach at Plymouth Argyle.

As a player, he was an attacking midfielder. He mainly competed at a semi-professional level, spending most of his career at Tiverton Town, although he did have a short stint as a pro at Argyle.

Playing career
Originally from a farming background  he played for Bideford before joining Tiverton Town in 1996. Nancekivell was a regular scorer from midfield, finishing as the club's top goalscorer twice, before being given a chance in the professional game at the age of 28 by Plymouth Argyle manager Kevin Hodges. He made six league appearances as a substitute, scoring his first goal against Hartlepool United on 21 October 2000, but fell out of first team contention after the arrival of Paul Sturrock. He rejoined Tiverton Town on loan in January 2001 and returned to Ladysmead permanently that summer. He scored Tiverton's consolation goal in the FA Cup first round defeat against Cardiff City in November 2001.

Coaching career
After retiring, Nancekivell took a job at Plymouth Argyle's youth coaching centre of excellence in 2005. He was promoted to coaching the first team in 2010. In January 2013 he was appointed as joint caretaker manager with Romain Larrieu following the sacking of Carl Fletcher. The duo lost their only game in charge, 4–0 to Port Vale. Kevin was released from his contract as First team coach following a backroom reshuffle by new manager John Sheridan however, he was offered an alternative role at the club and on 4 July 2013 he accepted a youth coaching role designed to help with youth team players' progression from the Academy to first-team football while also helping with the progress of some of the newer academy coaches.

In January 2014 Kevin was appointed as Professional Development Phase Coach for 17 to 21 year-olds at Torquay United, however following the closure of Torquay's Youth Department in May 2015, Kevin made a return to Plymouth Argyle as Head of Academy Coaching. In June 2017 Kevin was successfully awarded his UEFA Pro Licence and in May 2018 he was appointed as a first-team coach at Argyle, following the departure of Craig Brewster. After Derek Adams was sacked in April 2019, Nancekivell was appointed caretaker manager of Plymouth Argyle for their final match of the 2018–19 season. Following the appointment of Ryan Lowe as Plymouth Argyle manager in June 2019, Kevin retained his role as first team coach. In July 2021, Kevin graduated from the University of Liverpool with the LMA Diploma in Football Management.

References

1971 births
Living people
Sportspeople from Barnstaple
English footballers
Association football midfielders
Bideford A.F.C. players
Tiverton Town F.C. players
Plymouth Argyle F.C. players
Southern Football League players
English Football League players
Plymouth Argyle F.C. non-playing staff
English Football League managers
Plymouth Argyle F.C. managers
English football managers